George T. Fair (January 13, 1856 – February 12, 1939) was a Major League Baseball second baseman who played one game for the New York Mutuals in . The twenty-year-old Fair failed to get a hit in four at-bats in his lone big-league contest on July 29, then was dropped by the club. Born in Boston, Fair died in Roslindale, Massachusetts in 1939 at the age of 83. At the time of his death, Fair was the last living member of the Mutuals National League franchise, which was expelled from the NL after the 1876 season.

The first baseball encyclopedia, Hy Turkin and S. C. Thompson's Complete Encyclopedia of Baseball (first published in 1951), did not list Fair. Later references rectified this error, and Fair was given his rightful place in baseball history. (Whoever came up with Fair's pseudonym may have been thinking of the real Edward Thayer, or perhaps Ernest Thayer, author of the famous baseball poem Casey at the Bat.)

References

External links

1856 births
1939 deaths
New York Mutuals players
Major League Baseball second basemen
Rhode Islands players
Baseball players from Massachusetts
19th-century baseball players